Romain Desgranges, born on October 12, 1982 in Sainte-Colombe, is a French professional sport climber.

Biography 
Romain Desgranges started climbing when he was 14 years old in his school.

In 2017, he won both the Lead Climbing European Championships and  Lead Climbing World Cup.

Rankings

Climbing World Championships

Climbing European Championships

Climbing World Cup

World Games

Number of medals in the Climbing World Cup

Lead

Rock climbing

Boulder problems 
:
 The Kaizer Sauzé - Walid Wood (FRA) - 2011 - First ascent

:
 Radja - Branson (Monthey, SUI) - November 2009
 Underground Paradise - Fionnay (SUI) - First ascent

:
 La danse des Balrogs - Branson (Monthey, SUI) - November 2009
 Seveso - Fionnay (SUI) - September 2009 - First ascent
 Permanent Midnight - Fionnay (Switzerland) - September 2009

Redpointed routes 
:
 Haribal Lecter - Chamonix (FRA) - March 2011 - First ascent

 El intento - Cuenca (ESP) - April 2016

See also
List of grade milestones in rock climbing
History of rock climbing
Rankings of most career IFSC gold medals
Fred Rouhling, climbing partner of Romain Desgranges

References

External links 

 L'équipe de France aux Jeux mondiaux de 2009

French rock climbers
Living people
1982 births
Competitors at the 2009 World Games
Competitors at the 2013 World Games
Competitors at the 2017 World Games
World Games bronze medalists
Sportspeople from Hautes-Alpes
IFSC Climbing World Cup overall medalists